Mkuranga is one of the six districts of Pwani Region in Tanzania.  It is bordered to the north by Dar es Salaam, to the east by the Indian Ocean, to the south by Rufiji District, and to the west by Kisarawe District.The district is the historical homeland of the Ndengereko and Zaramo people.

In 2016 the Tanzania National Bureau of Statistics report the population of Mkuranga District were 243,062 people in the district, from 222,921 in 2012.

Wards

Mkuranga is administratively divided into 18 wards:

 Bupu
 Kimanzichana
 Kisiju
 Kitomondo
 Lukanga
 Magawa
 Mbezi
 Mkamba
 Mkuranga
 Mwalusembe
 Nyamato
 Panzuo
 Shungubweni
 Tambani
 Vikindu
 Kiparang'anda
 Njianne
 Vianzi

References

Sources
 Mkuranga District Homepage for the 2002 Tanzania National Census

Districts of Pwani Region